Anguilla borneensis, also known as the Borneo eel is a species of the genus Anguilla found in Borneo.

References

Anguillidae
Fish described in 1924